In the mathematical field of topology, a development is a countable collection of open covers of a topological space that satisfies certain separation axioms.

Let  be a topological space. A space with a development is called developable.
 
A development  such that  for all  is called a nested development. A theorem from Vickery states that every developable space in fact has a nested development.

Vickery's theorem implies that a topological space is a Moore space if and only if it is regular and developable.

References
 
 
 

General topology